Eugen Trică (born 5 August 1976) is a Romanian football manager and former footballer who played as a midfielder, currently in charge of Liga II club Concordia Chiajna.

Club career
Eugen Trică was born on 5 August 1976 in the village of Teslui from Romania where he spent the first years of his life, being raised mainly by his grandparents until age 7 when he had to move to Craiova in order to go to school. Shortly after arriving in Craiova, his father noticed his talent while seeing him play football in the neighborhood so he took him to local club Universitatea where he started his career as a youth, being promoted in the first team in 1995, making his Liga I debut on 17 June 1995 in a 5–4 loss against Electroputere Craiova. He played 91 Liga I games for "U" Craiova in which he scored 14 goals, managing to reach the 1998 Cupa României final in 1998 which was lost in front of Rapid București, also during this period he earned the nickname José after teammate Ionel Gane compared him to José Mari Bakero. He then joined Steaua București in 1998, winning the championship in the 2000–01 season in which he played 30 games and scored 7 goals, also scoring two goals in Steaua's 2–1 victory against Dinamo București in the 2001 Supercupa României. Litex Lovech was the third club Trică played for after being transferred in 2003, where he scored 22 goals in 54 league matches, winning the Bulgarian Cup in 2004. He joined the squad of Maccabi Tel Aviv in 2005, but after only a few months he returned to Bulgaria, this time at CSKA Sofia where he played alongside fellow Romanians Florentin Petre and Alexandru Pițurcă, managing to win the 2005–06 Bulgarian Cup and the 2006 Bulgarian Supercup. Trică was one of the highest scoring foreign players in the Bulgarian league with 39 goals to his name. In 2007, Trică returned to Romania, signing with CFR Cluj, where he was part of the team that won for the first time in the club's history the championship and the cup in 2008 with Trică being the team's top scorer with 13 goals in 31 league matches, also playing five games in the 2008–09 Champions League group stage. He moved in 2009 to Anorthosis in Cyprus, but after the end of the season, he returned to CFR Cluj where he won the 2009 Supercupa României. In 2009, Eugen Trică came back to his first club, Universitatea Craiova, but after a year, in 2010, he joined Concordia Chiajna, a team from the second Romanian division which he helped promote to Liga I for the first time in history and after a few games in the first division for Concordia, in October 2011, Trică decided to end his playing career.

International career
Eugen Trică played four games for Romania, making his debut on 3 March 1999 when coach Victor Pițurcă introduced him in the 74th minute to replace Dennis Șerban in a friendly which ended with a 2–0 victory against Estonia. His following game was a 1–0 victory in a friendly against Ukraine and the last two were appearances at the successful Euro 2008 qualifiers, a 3–1 victory against Belarus and a 1–0 loss against Bulgaria.

International stats

Managerial career
Eugen Trică started his coaching career in 2012 at Juventus București, after which he coached various other teams, including as an assistant coach, his biggest performances being a runner-up position in a Cupa României final with CFR Cluj and two promotions from the third league to the second and from the second to the first with FC U Craiova.

On 22 September 2022, he became the head coach of Liga II side Concordia Chiajna.

Personal life
Eugen Trică was married to Lorena, daughter of Ilie Balaci, one of the best Romanian football players from the past. They divorced in 2015. Their son, Atanas Trică is also a footballer.

Honours

Player
Universitatea Craiova
Cupa României runner-up: 1997–98
Steaua București
Divizia A: 2000–01
Supercupa României: 2001
Litex Lovech
Bulgarian Cup: 2003–04
CSKA Sofia
Bulgarian Cup: 2005–06
Bulgarian Super Cup: 2006
CFR Cluj
Liga I: 2007–08
Cupa României: 2007–08
Supercupa României: 2009

Manager
CFR Cluj
Cupa României runner-up: 2012–13
FC U Craiova 1948
Liga II: 2020–21
Liga III: 2019–20

References

External links
 
 
 
 

1976 births
Living people
People from Dolj County
Romanian footballers
Romania under-21 international footballers
Romania international footballers
Romanian expatriate footballers
Association football midfielders
FC U Craiova 1948 players
FC Steaua București players
PFC CSKA Sofia players
Maccabi Tel Aviv F.C. players
Expatriate footballers in Israel
PFC Litex Lovech players
CFR Cluj players
Anorthosis Famagusta F.C. players
CS Concordia Chiajna players
Liga I players
Liga II players
First Professional Football League (Bulgaria) players
Cypriot First Division players
Expatriate footballers in Bulgaria
Expatriate footballers in Cyprus
Romanian expatriate sportspeople in Israel
Romanian expatriate sportspeople in Bulgaria
Romanian expatriate sportspeople in Cyprus
Romanian football managers
ASC Daco-Getica București managers
CFR Cluj managers
FC UTA Arad managers
CS Sportul Snagov managers
FC U Craiova 1948 managers
AFC Turris-Oltul Turnu Măgurele managers
ACS Viitorul Târgu Jiu managers
FC Metaloglobus București managers
CS Concordia Chiajna managers